Haplogroup E-M2, also known as E1b1a1-M2, is a human Y-chromosome DNA haplogroup. E-M2 is primarily distributed within sub-Saharan Africa. More specifically, E-M2 is the predominant subclade in West Africa, Central Africa, Southern Africa, and the region of the African Great Lakes; it also occurs at moderate frequencies in North Africa and Middle East. E-M2 has several subclades, but many of these subhaplogroups are included in either E-L485 or E-U175. E-M2 is especially common among indigenous Africans who speak Niger-Congo languages, and was spread to Southern Africa and East Africa through the Bantu expansion.

Origins

The discovery of two SNPs (V38 and V100) by Trombetta et al. (2011) significantly redefined the E-V38 phylogenetic tree. This led the authors to suggest that E-V38 may have originated in East Africa. E-V38 joins the West African-affiliated E-M2 and the Northeast African-affiliated E-M329 with an earlier common ancestor who, like E-P2, may have also originated in East Africa. The downstream SNP E-M180 may have originated in the humid south-central Saharan savanna/grassland of North Africa between 14,000 BP and 10,000 BP. According to Wood et al. (2005) and Rosa et al. (2007), such population movements changed the pre-existing population Y chromosomal diversity in Central, Southern, and Southeastern Africa, replacing the previous haplogroup frequencies in these areas with the now dominant E1b1a1 lineages. Traces of earlier inhabitants, however, can be observed today in these regions via the presence of the Y DNA haplogroups A1a, A1b, A2, A3, and B-M60 that are common in certain populations, such as the Mbuti and Khoisan.

Ancient DNA

Within Africa

Botswana

At Taukome, in Botswana, an individual, dated to the Early Iron Age (1100 BP), carried haplogroups E1b1a1 (E-M2, E-Z1123) and L0d3b1.

At Xaro, in Botswana, there were two individuals, dated to the Early Iron Age (1400 BP); one carried haplogroups E1b1a1a1c1a and L3e1a2, and another carried haplogroups E1b1b1b2b (E-M293, E-CTS10880) and L0k1a2.

Democratic Republic of Congo

At Kindoki, in the Democratic Republic of Congo, there were three individuals, dated to the protohistoric period (230 BP, 150 BP, 230 BP); one carried haplogroups E1b1a1a1d1a2 (E-CTS99, E-CTS99) and L1c3a1b, another carried haplogroup E (E-M96, E-PF1620), and the last carried haplogroups R1b1 (R-P25 1, R-M415) and L0a1b1a1.

Egypt

Hawass et al. (2012) determined that the mummy of an unknown man buried with Ramesses was, because of the proven genetic relationship and a mummification process that suggested punishment,  a good candidate for the pharaoh's son, Pentaweret, who was the only son to revolt against his father. It was impossible to determine his cause of death. Using Whit Athey's haplogroup predictor based on Y-STR values both mummies were predicted to share the Y chromosomal haplogroup E1b1a1-M2 and 50% of their genetic material, which pointed to a father-son relationship. Gad et al. (2021) indicates that Ramesses III and Unknown Man E, possibly Pentawere, carried haplogroup E1b1a.

Kenya

At Deloraine Farm, in Nakuru County, Kenya, an iron metallurgist of the Iron Age carried haplogroups E1b1a1a1a1a/E-M58 and L5b1.

Outside of Africa

Mexico

At a San Jose de los Naturales Royal Hospital burial site, in Mexico City, Mexico, three enslaved West Africans of West African and Southern African ancestry, dated between 1453 CE and 1626 CE, 1450 CE and 1620 CE, and 1436 CE and 1472 CE, were found; one carried haplogroups E1b1a1a1c1b/E-M263.2 and L1b2a, another carried haplogroups E1b1a1a1d1/E-P278.1/E-M425 and L3d1a1a, and the last carried haplogroups E1b1a1a1c1a1c/E-CTS8030 and L3e1a1a. Human leukocyte antigen alleles further confirm that the individuals were of Sub-Saharan African origin.

Portugal

At Cabeço da Amoreira, in Portugal, an enslaved West African man, who may have been from the Senegambian coastal region of Gambia, Mauritania, or Senegal, and carried haplogroups E1b1a and L3b1a, was buried among shell middens between the 16th century CE and the 18th century CE.

Spain

In Granada, a Muslim (Moor) of the Cordoba Caliphate, who was of haplogroups E1b1a1 and H1+16189, as well as estimated to date between 900 CE and 1000 CE, and a Morisco, who was of haplogroup L2e1, as well as estimated to date between 1500 CE and 1600 CE, were both found to be of West African (i.e., Gambian) and Iberian descent.

United States of America

At an Anson Street burial site, in Charleston, South Carolina, there were 18 African Americans found who were dated to the 18th century CE. Banza was of western Central African ancestry and carried haplogroups E1b1a-CTS668 and L3e3b1. Lima was of West African ancestry and carried haplogroups E1b1a-M4671 and L3b3. Kuto was of western Central African ancestry and carried haplogroups E1b1a-CTS2198 and L2a1a2. Anika was of Sub-Saharan African ancestry and carried haplogroups E1b1a-CTS6126 and L2b1. Nana was of West African ancestry and carried haplogroup L2b3a. Zimbu was of western Central African ancestry and carried haplogroups E1b1a-CTS5497 and L3e1e. Wuta was of Sub-Saharan African ancestry and carried haplogroups E1b1a-CTS7305 and L3e2b+152. Daba was of West African ancestry and carried haplogroups E1b1a-M4273 and L2c. Fumu was of Sub-Saharan African ancestry and carried haplogroups B2a1a-Y12201 and L3e2b+152. Lisa was of West African ancestry and carried haplogroups E1b1a-Z6020 and H100. Ganda was of West African ancestry and carried haplogroups E1b1a-CTS5612 and L1c1c. Coosaw was of West African and Native American ancestry and carried haplogroups E2b1a-CTS2400 and A2. Kidzera was of western Central African ancestry and carried haplogroup L2a1a2c. Pita was of Sub-Saharan African ancestry and carried haplogroups E1b1a-M4287 and L3e2b. Tima was of western Central African ancestry and carried haplogroup L3e1e. Jode was of Sub-Saharan African ancestry and carried haplogroups E1b1a-CTS4975 and L2a1a2c. Ajana was of western Central African ancestry and carried haplogroup L2a1I. Isi was of western Central African ancestry and carried haplogroup L3e2a.

Medical DNA

Sickle Cell

Amid the Green Sahara, the mutation for sickle cell originated in the Sahara or in the northwest forest region of western Central Africa (e.g., Cameroon) by at least 7,300 years ago, though possibly as early as 22,000 years ago. The ancestral sickle cell haplotype to modern haplotypes (e.g., Cameroon/Central African Republic and Benin/Senegal haplotypes) may have first arose in the ancestors of modern West Africans, bearing haplogroups E1b1a1-L485 and E1b1a1-U175 or their ancestral haplogroup E1b1a1-M4732. West Africans (e.g., Yoruba and Esan of Nigeria), bearing the Benin sickle cell haplotype, may have migrated through the northeastern region of Africa into the western region of Arabia. West Africans (e.g., Mende of Sierra Leone), bearing the Senegal sickle cell haplotype, may have migrated into Mauritania (77% modern rate of occurrence) and Senegal (100%); they may also have migrated across the Sahara, into North Africa, and from North Africa, into Southern Europe, Turkey, and a region near northern Iraq and southern Turkey. Some may have migrated into and introduced the Senegal and Benin sickle cell haplotypes into Basra, Iraq, where both occur equally. West Africans, bearing the Benin sickle cell haplotype, may have migrated into the northern region of Iraq (69.5%), Jordan (80%), Lebanon (73%), Oman (52.1%), and Egypt (80.8%).

Distribution

E-M2's frequency and diversity are highest in West Africa. Within Africa, E-M2 displays a west-to-east as well as a south-to-north clinal distribution. In other words, the frequency of the haplogroup decreases as one moves from western and southern Africa toward the eastern and northern parts of Africa.

Populations in Northwest Africa, central Eastern Africa and Madagascar have tested at more moderate frequencies.

E-M2 is found at low to moderate frequencies in North Africa, and Northeast Africa. Some of the lineages found in these areas are possibly due to the Bantu expansion or other migrations. However, the discovery in 2011 of the E-M2 marker that predates E-M2 has led Trombetta et al. to suggest that E-M2 may have originated in East Africa. In Eritrea and most of Ethiopia (excluding the Anuak), E-V38 is usually found in the form of E-M329, which is autochthonous, while E-M2 generally indicates Bantu migratory origins.

Outside of Africa, E-M2 has been found at low frequencies. The clade has been found at low frequencies in West Asia. A few isolated occurrences of E-M2 have also been observed among populations in Southern Europe, such as Croatia, Malta, Spain and Portugal.

The Trans-Atlantic slave trade brought people to North America, Central America and South America including the Caribbean. Consequently, the haplogroup is often observed in the United States populations in men who self-identify as African Americans. It has also been observed in a number of populations in Mexico, the Caribbean, Central America, and South America among people of African descent.

Subclades

E1b1a1

  

E1b1a1 is defined by markers DYS271/M2/SY81, M291, P1/PN1, P189, P293, V43, and V95. Whilst E1b1a reaches its highest frequency of 81% in Senegal, only 1 of the 139 Senegalese that were tested showed M191/P86. In other words, as one moves to West Africa from western Central Africa, the less subclade E1b1a1f is found. Cruciani et al. (2002) states: "A possible explanation might be that haplotype 24 chromosomes [E-M2*] were already present across the Sudanese belt when the M191 mutation, which defines haplotype 22, arose in central western Africa. Only then would a later demic expansion have brought haplotype 22 chromosomes from central western to western Africa, giving rise to the opposite clinal distributions of haplotypes 22 and 24."

E1b1a1a1

E1b1a1a1 is commonly defined by M180/P88. The basal subclade is quite regularly observed in M2+ samples.

E1b1a1a1a

E1b1a1a1a is defined by marker M58. 5% (2/37) of the town Singa-Rimaïbé, Burkina Faso tested positive for E-M58. 15% (10/69) of Hutus in Rwanda tested positive for M58. Three South Africans tested positive for this marker. One Carioca from Rio de Janeiro, Brazil tested positive for the M58 SNP. The place of origin and age is unreported.

E1b1a1a1b

E1b1a1a1b is defined by M116.2, a private marker. A single carrier was found in Mali.

E1b1a1a1c

E1b1a1a1c is defined by private marker M149. This marker was found in a single South African.

E1b1a1a1d

E1b1a1a1d is defined by a private marker M155. It is known from a single carrier in Mali.

E1b1a1a1e

E1b1a1a1e is defined by markers M10, M66, M156 and M195. Wairak people in Tanzania tested 4.6% (2/43) positive for E-M10. E-M10 was found in a single person of the Lissongo group in the Central African Republic and two members in a "Mixed" population from the Adamawa region.

E1b1a1a1f

E1b1a1a1f is defined by L485. The basal node E-L485* appears to be somewhat uncommon but has not been sufficiently tested in large populations. The ancestral L485 SNP (along with several of its subclades) was very recently discovered. Some of these SNPs have little or no published population data and/or have yet to receive nomenclature recognition by the YCC.

 E1b1a1a1f1 is defined by marker L514. This SNP is currently without population study data outside of the 1000 Genomes Project.
 E1b1a1a1f1a (YCC E1b1a7) is defined by marker M191/P86. Filippo et al. (2011) studied a number of African populations that were E-M2 positive and found the basal E-M191/P86 (without E-P252/U174) in a population of Gur speakers in Burkina Faso. Montano et al. (2011) found similar sparse distribution of E-M191* in Nigeria, Gabon, Cameroon and Congo. M191/P86 positive samples occurred in tested populations of Annang (38.3%), Ibibio (45.6%), Efik (45%), and Igbo (54.3%) living in  Nigeria, West Africa. E-M191/P86 appears in varying frequencies in Central and Southern Africa but almost all are also positive for P252/U174. Bantu-speaking South Africans (89/343) tested 25.9% positive and Khoe-San speaking South Africans tested 7.7% (14/183) positive for this SNP. It also appears commonly in Africans living in the Americas. A population in Rio de Janeiro, Brazil tested 9.2% (12/130) positive. 34.9% (29/83) of African American men tested positive for M191.
Veeramah et al. (2010) studies of the recombining portions of M191 positive Y chromosomes suggest that this lineage has "diffusely spread with multiple high frequency haplotypes implying a longer evolutionary period since this haplogroup arose". The subclade  E1b1a1a1f1a appears to express opposite clinal distributions to E1b1a1* in the West African Savanna region. Haplogroup E1b1a1a1f1a (E-M191) has a frequency of 23% in Cameroon (where it represents 42% of haplotypes carrying the DYS271 mutation or E-M2), 13% in Burkina Faso (16% of haplotypes carrying the M2/DYS271 mutation) and only 1% in Senegal. Similarly, while E1b1a reaches its highest frequency of 81% in Senegal, only 1 of the 139 Senegalese that were tested showed M191/P86. In other words, as one moves to West Africa from western Central Africa, the less subclade E1b1a1f is found. "A possible explanation might be that haplotype 24 chromosomes [E-M2*] were already present across the Sudanese belt when the M191 mutation, which defines haplotype 22, arose in central western Africa. Only then would a later demic expansion have brought haplotype 22 chromosomes from central western to western Africa, giving rise to the opposite clinal distributions of haplotypes 22 and 24."

 E1b1a1a1f1a1 (YCC E1b1a7a) is defined by P252/U174. It appears to be the most common subclade of E-L485. It is believed to have originated near western Central Africa. It is rarely found in the most western portions of West Africa.  Montano et al. (2011) found this subclade very prevalent in Nigeria and Gabon. Filippo et al. (2011) estimated a tMRCA of ~4.2 kya from sample of Yoruba population positive for the SNP.
 E1b1a1a1f1a1b (YCC  E1b1a7a2) is defined by P115. This subclade has only been observed amongst Fang people of Central Africa.
 E1b1a1a1f1a1c (YCC E1b1a7a3) is defined by P116. Montano et al. (2011) observed this SNP only in Gabon and a Bassa population from Cameroon.
 E1b1a1a1f1a1d is defined by Z1704. This subclade has been observed across Africa. The 1000 Genomes Project Consortium found this SNP in  Yoruba Nigerian, three Kenyan Luhyas and one African descent Puerto Rican.

 E1b1a1a1f1b is defined by markers L515, L516, L517, and M263.2. This subclade was found by the researchers of Y-Chromosome Genome Comparison Project using data from the commercial bioinformatics company 23andMe.

E1b1a1a1g

E1b1a1a1g (YCC E1b1a8) is defined by marker U175. The basal E-U175* is extremely rare. Montano et al. (2011) only found one out of 505 tested African subjects who was U175 positive but negative for U209. Brucato et al. found similarly low frequencies of basal E-U175* in subjects in the Ivory Coast and Benin. Veeramah et al. (2010) found U175 in tested Annang (45.3%), Ibibio (37%), Efik (33.3%), and Igbo (25.3%) but did not test for U209.

The supposed "Bantu haplotype" found in E-U175 carriers is "present at appreciable frequencies in other Niger–Congo languages speaking peoples as far west as Guinea-Bissau". This is the modal haplotype of STR markers that is common in carriers of E-U175.

E1b1a1a1g has several subclades.
 E1b1a1a1g1 (YCC E1b1a8a) is defined by U209. It is the most prominent subclade of U175. This subclade has very high frequencies of over fifty percentages in Cameroonian populations of Bassa and Bakaka, possibly indicating place of origin. However, E-U209 is widely found at lower frequencies in West and Central African countries surrounding Cameroon and Gabon. Brucato et al. (2010) found the SNP in a populations of Ahizi (in Ivory Coast) 38.8% (19/49), Yacouba (Ivory Coast) 27.5% (11/40), and Beninese 6.5% (5/77) respectively.
 E1b1a1a1g1a (YCC E1b1a8a1) is defined by U290. The Montano et al. (2011) study of U290 showed a lower frequency in Nigeria (11.7%) and western Central Africa than basal node U209. The highest population frequency rate in that study was 57.7% (15/26) in Ewondo in Cameroon. 32.5% (27/83) of African American men tested by Sims et al. (2007) were positive for this SNP.
 E1b1a1a1g1a2 is defined by Z1725. This marker has been observed by The 1000 Genomes Project Consortium in Yoruba Nigerians and Luhya Kenyans.
 E1b1a1a1g1c (YCC E1b1a4) is defined by M154. A Bamilike population tested 31.3% (15/48) for the marker. Bakaka speakers from Cameroon tested 8%. An Ovimbundu test population found this SNP at 14% (14/100). Members of this subclade have also been found in South Africa.
 E1b1a1a1g1d is defined by V39. Trombetta et al. first published this SNP in 2011 but gave little population data about it. It is only known to have been found in an African population.

E1b1a1a1h

E1b1a1a1h is defined by markers P268 and P269. It was first reported in a person from the Gambia.

Phylogenetics

Phylogenetic history

Prior to 2002, there were in academic literature at least seven naming systems for the Y-Chromosome Phylogenetic tree. This led to considerable confusion. In 2002, the major research groups came together and formed the Y-Chromosome Consortium (YCC). They published a joint paper that created a single new tree that all agreed to use. Later, a group of citizen scientists with an interest in population genetics and genetic genealogy formed a working group to create an amateur tree aiming at being above all timely.  The table below brings together all of these works at the point of the landmark 2002 YCC Tree. This allows a researcher reviewing older published literature to quickly move between nomenclatures.

Research publications

The following research teams per their publications were represented in the creation of the YCC tree.

Phylogenetic trees

This phylogenetic tree of haplogroup  subclades is based on the Y-Chromosome Consortium (YCC) 2008 Tree, the ISOGG Y-DNA Haplogroup E Tree, and subsequent published research.

 E1b1a1 (DYS271/M2/SY81, M291, P1/PN1, P189, P293, V43, V95, Z1101, Z1107, Z1116, Z1120, Z1122, Z1123, Z1124, Z1125, Z1127, Z1130, Z1133)
  E1b1a1a (L576)
 E1b1a1a1 (L86.1, L88.3, M180/P88, PAGES00066, P182, Z1111, Z1112)
 E1b1a1a1a (M58, PAGES00027)
 E1b1a1a1b (M116.2)
 E1b1a1a1c (M149)
 E1b1a1a1d (M155)
 E1b1a1a1e (M10, M66, M156, M195)
 E1b1a1a1f (L485)
 E1b1a1a1f1 (L514)
 E1b1a1a1f1a (M191/P86, P253/U247, U186, Z1712)
 E1b1a1a1f1a1 (P252/U174)
 E1b1a1a1f1a1a (P9.2)
 E1b1a1a1f1a1b (P115)
 E1b1a1a1f1a1c (P116)
 E1b1a1a1f1a1c1 (P113)
 E1b1a1a1f1a1d (Z1704)
 (L372)
 E1b1a1a1f1b (L515, L516, L517, M263.2)
 E1b1a1a1f1b1 (Z1893)
 (Z1894)
 E1b1a1a1g (U175)
 E1b1a1a1g1 (L220.3, L652, P277, P278.1, U209,  M4254, M4230, CTS4921/M4243/V3224)
 E1b1a1a1g1a (U290)
 E1b1a1a1g1a1 (U181)
 E1b1a1a1g1a1a (L97)
 E1b1a1a1g1a2 (Z1725)
 E1b1a1a1g1b (P59)
 E1b1a1a1g1c (M154)
 E1b1a1a1g1d (V39)
 E1b1a1a1h (P268, P269)

See also

Genetics

Y-DNA E subclades

Y-DNA backbone tree

Notes

References

Sources for conversion tables

External links

 Haplogroup E1b1a FTDNA Project
 Distribution of E1b1a/E3a in Africa
 Spread of Haplogroup E3a, from National Geographic

E1b1a